The Reform Monument is a Category B listed monument on Broad Street, at its junction with Longate, in Peterhead, Scotland, built in 1833. A Roman doric column, it is surmounted by arms of Earl Marischal, inspired by the gateway of Inverugie Castle. (Architectural historian Charles McKean wrote that the arms were "robbed" from the castle.)

The Reform Monument should not be confused with the Reform Tower in the Meethill area of Peterhead, built a year earlier.

See also
List of listed buildings in Peterhead, Aberdeenshire

References

External links
REFORM MONUMENT, BROAD STREET - Historic Environment Scotland

Listed buildings in Peterhead
Tourist attractions in Peterhead
1833 sculptures
Category B listed buildings in Aberdeenshire
Listed monuments and memorials in Scotland
Statues in Scotland
1833 establishments in Scotland